Judges 20 is the twentieth chapter of the Book of Judges in the Old Testament or the Hebrew Bible. According to Jewish tradition the book was attributed to the prophet Samuel, but modern scholars view it as part of the Deuteronomistic History, which spans in the books of Deuteronomy to 2 Kings, attributed to nationalistic and devotedly Yahwistic writers during the time of the reformer Judean king Josiah in 7th century BCE. This chapter records the war between the tribe of Benjamin and the other eleven tribes of Israel, belonging to a section comprising Judges 17 to 21.

Text
This chapter was originally written in the Hebrew language. It is divided into 48 verses.

Textual witnesses

Some early manuscripts containing the text of this chapter in Hebrew are of the Masoretic Text tradition, which includes the Codex Cairensis (895), Aleppo Codex (10th century), and Codex Leningradensis (1008). 

Extant ancient manuscripts of a translation into Koine Greek known as the Septuagint (originally was made in the last few centuries BCE) include Codex Vaticanus (B; B; 4th century) and Codex Alexandrinus (A; A; 5th century).

Analysis

Double Introduction and Double Conclusion
Chapters 17 to 21 contain the "Double Conclusion" of the Book of Judges and form a type of  inclusio together with their counterpart, the "Double Introduction", in chapters 1 to 3:6 as in the following structure of the whole book:
A. Foreign wars of subjugation with the ḥērem being applied (1:1–2:5)
B. Difficulties with foreign religious idols (2:6–3:6)
 Main part: the "cycles" section(3:7–16:31)
B'. Difficulties with domestic religious idols (17:1–18:31)
A'. Domestic wars with the ḥērem being applied (19:1–21:25)

There are similar parallels between the double introduction and the double conclusion as the following: 

 

The entire double conclusion is connected by the four-time repetition of a unique statement: twice in full at the beginning and the end of the double conclusion and twice in the center of the section as follows:

 A. In those days there was no king…
Every man did what right in his own eyes (17:6)
B. In those days there was no king… (18:1)
B'. In those days there was no king… (19:1)
 A'. In those days there was no king…
Every man did what right in his own eyes (21:25)

It also contains internal links:
Conclusion 1 (17:1–18:31): A Levite in Judah moving to the hill country of Ephraim and then on to Dan.
Conclusion 2 (19:1–21:25): A Levite in Ephraim looking for his concubine in Bethlehem in Judah.
Both sections end with a reference to Shiloh.

The Bethlehem Trilogy
Three sections of the Hebrew Bible (Old Testament) — Judges 17–18, Judges 19–21, Ruth 1–4 — form a trilogy with a link to the city Bethlehem of Judah and characterized by the repetitive unique statement:
"In those days there was no king in Israel; everyone did what was right in his own eyes"
(Judges 17:6; 18:1; 19:1; 21:25; cf. Ruth 1:1)
as in the following chart:

Chapters 19 to 21
The section comprising Judges 19:1-21:25 has a chiastic structure of five episodes as follows:
A. The Rape of the Concubine (19:1–30)
B. ḥērem ("holy war") of Benjamin (20:1–48)
C. Problem: The Oaths-Benjamin Threatened with Extinction (21:1–5)
B'. ḥērem ("holy war") of Jabesh Gilead (21:6–14)
A'. The Rape of the Daughters of Shiloh (21:15–25)

The rape of the daughters of Shiloh is the ironic counterpoint to the rape of the Levite's concubine, with the "daughter" motif linking the two stories ( and Judges 21:21), and the women becoming 'doorways leading into and out of war, sources of contention and reconciliation'.

Preparation for war (20:1–11)
This chapter records the detailed process of a civil war that pits the pan-Israelite unity against a tribal unity. It also wrestles with the execution of a 'ban" (Hebrew: herem; "holy war") whether Israel should eliminate a whole tribe to root out evil in its own midst as required in Deuteronomy 13:12-18. As stated in Deuteronomy 13:14, an investigation must first be undertaken before the Israel confederation can declare war against alleged miscreants (verses 3–7; cf. 'base fellows' in Deuteronomy 13:13). The tribe of Benjamin did not send any representative to the gathering, although they have heard about the event (verse 3). The Levite was called to testify about the crime committed against his concubine, but as a sole witness he heightened the evil deed of the Gibeahites, while omitting his cowardly sacrifice of her. There was a unity of the tribes ("as one man" in verses 1, 8, 11) and a single-mindedness in rooting out the evil in their midst, that vengeance was to be directed to the entire city of Gibeah, because of the evildoers in their midst, just as the action against a breaker of covenant would be extended to their families and townsmen (cf. Deuteronomy 13:15–16; Joshua 7:24–25).

Verse 1
Then all the children of Israel went out, and the congregation was gathered together as one man, from Dan even to Beersheba, with the land of Gilead, unto the LORD in Mizpeh.
"From Dan … to Beersheba":  Dan was located in the far north of the land, while Beersheba was in the far south, so the phrase denotes all the Israel territory of the land of Canaan.
"The land of Gilead" was located on the eastern side of the Jordan River ("Trans-Jordan").

Benjaminite War (20:12–48)
The war between the tribe of Benjamin against the other tribes of Israel consists of three battles with similar structure of reports in this chapter. The focus is on how the people of Israel would gradually humble themselves before YHWH (after two losses), so that the goals of Israel and YHWH would coincide (a huge victory against the Benjaminites.

The head count of the fighting men both from the Benjaminites and the other tribes of Israel in verses 15-17 can be compared to the last count in Numbers 26 as follows:

Assuming that the ratio between the number of men able to go to war and the total population remains relatively constant, the count indicates a decline of almost 30 percent in Israel's population since they entered the land of Canaan,so 'despite the victories under Joshua, Israel has not prospered since its arrival in Canaan' (cf. Deuteronomy 28:29).

The battle report structure, especially for the first battle in chapter 20, is similar to that in chapter 1 as follows:

The battle in Judges 1
 Preinquiry Actions
 (None)
Israelites Inquiry
"Who will be the first to go up [lb] and fight for us against the Canaanites?" (1:1)
Yahweh's Response
"Judah is to go; I have given the land into their hands" (1:2)
Result
Men of Judah make a deal with the Simeonites but victories come over the bulk of Canaanites (except in the 'mq) (1:3-20)

 The battles in Judges 20
 First battle
Preinquiry Actions
Make plans against Gibeah and threaten city (20:8-13a)
Israelites Inquiry
"Who of us shall go (lb) first to fight against the Benjaminites?" (20:18a)
Yahweh's Response
"Judah shall go first" (but no promise of victory) (20:18b)
Result
Israelites attack Gibeah en masse, are defeated severely by Benjaminites (20:19-21)

 Second battle
Preinquiry Actions
Israelites encourage one another and again take up their positions (20:22)
Israelites weep before Yahweh (20:23a)
Israelites Inquiry
"Shall we go up (lb) again to battle against the Benjaminites, our brothers?" (20:23a)
Yahweh's Response
"Go up against them" (20:23b) - no promise of victory
Result
Israelites attack en masse, are defeated severely by Benjaminites (though not quite as badly) (20:24-25)

 Third battle
Preinquiry Actions
Israelites—all the people—weep fast, and present sacrifices (20:26)
Israelites Inquiry
Inquiry through Phinehas, the high priest, "Shall we go up [lb] again to battle with Benjamin our brother or not?" (20:28a)
Yahweh's Response
"Go, for tomorrow I will give them into your hands" (20:28b)
Result
Israelites set ambush and herem ("ban"; killing all people, burning all towns) Benjaminites—except for 600 men (20:47, the same number as the Danites in 18:11).

The battle accounts appear to end, but because 600 Benjaminites escape, the finale of the battle is not technically a full imposition of the ban, which, in the Books of Deuteronomy and Joshua, is described as the killing of all human enemies.

Verses 26–28
And Phinehas, the son of Eleazar, the son of Aaron, stood before it in those days,) saying, Shall I yet again go out to battle against the children of Benjamin my brother, or shall I cease?And the Lord said, 
Go up; for to morrow I will deliver them into thine hand.
"Phinehas": mentioned in Numbers 25:7–13; Joshua 22.

See also

Related Bible parts: Deuteronomy 13, Joshua 7, Judges 19, Judges 21

Notes

References

Sources

External links
 Jewish translations:
 Shoftim - Judges - Chapter 20 (Judaica Press). Hebrew text and English translation [with Rashi's commentary] at Chabad.org
 Christian translations:
 Online Bible at GospelHall.org (ESV, KJV, Darby, American Standard Version, Bible in Basic English)
 Judges chapter 20. Bible Gateway

20